Joseph McDonagh (November 1953 – 20 May 2016) was an Irish hurler and, later, Gaelic games administrator, who served as the president of the Gaelic Athletic Association from 1997 until 2000. He played hurling with his club Ballinderreen and the Galway senior team.

Early life and education
Born in Tuam, County Galway, McDonagh was introduced to hurling by his father, a long-serving Gaelic games administrator and schoolteacher. He developed his hurling skills at Coláiste Éinde, while also excelling at Gaelic football as a result of the coaching of teacher Enda Colleran.

With University College Galway (UCG), McDonagh played both Gaelic football and hurling and was a Fitzgibbon Cup medal winner as a postgraduate student in 1977. He was also a regular on the Sigerson Cup team in his time there, playing in five of the football competitions. He had previously won a Freshers hurling medal in 1972 and earned his B.A. from the university in 1975. His son, Eoin, also played in six Fizgibbon Cups for UCG.

McDonagh was a linguist who was fluent in three languages (Irish, English and Welsh). He went on to complete an M.A. in Celtic Studies

Career

Club
McDonagh enjoyed a lengthy club hurling career with Ballinderreen, while he also played Gaelic football with Cortoon Shamrocks and Barna.

McDonagh captained his club Ballinderreen to the 1978 Galway Senior Hurling Championship Final. They faced neighbouring club Ardrahan. Played in Ballinasloe, the match ended in a draw, Ballinderreen 0-16 Ardrahan 2-10. After a close match in the replay, McDonagh's side lost by 2-14 to 2-18. Towards the latter end of his hurling career, Joe captained his side to win the Galway Junior B hurling Championship in 1996.

Inter-county
McDonagh made his début on the inter-county scene at the age of sixteen when he first linked up with the Galway minor team. An All-Ireland runner-up in this grade, he later won an All-Ireland medal with the under-21 team. McDonagh made his senior début during the 1972-73 league. He went on to play a key role for Galway during a breakthrough era, and won one All-Ireland medal as a non-playing substitute in 1980 and one National Hurling League medal. He was an All-Ireland runner-up on two occasions.

One of the most iconic moments associated with McDonagh is his rendition of "The West's Awake" from the Hogan Stand in Croke Park after winning that All-Ireland with Galway in 1980. RTÉ commentator Michael O'Hehir memorably responded: "Well done Joe McDonagh".

Throughout his career McDonagh made 15 championship appearances for Galway. His retirement came following the conclusion of the 1983 championship. In 2005, the Irish Independent named him amongst its substitutes in its list of "The Men Who Changed the Face of Galway Hurling".

Inter-provincial
As a member of the Connacht inter-provincial team at various times throughout his career, McDonagh won two Railway Cup medals.

Retirement and later life
In retirement from playing McDonagh became involved in the administrative affairs of the Gaelic Athletic Association. He was elected to the Galway County Board as Irish Officer in 1979 and went on to represent Galway on the Central Council in 1988, being appointed to the chair of the hurling work group on his first day. Runner-up to Jack Boothman in the 1993 election for the position, he subsequently became the 32nd president of the Gaelic Athletic Association between 1997 and 2000.

McDonagh died on 20 May 2016, following a short illness. Invited to attend a reunion with his teammates at his university in November 2015, he was unable to attend as he had been in hospital with what was thought to be pneumonia. The illness was later discovered to be cancer, which ultimately proved terminal. His son, Eoin, delivering an oration at the funeral mass, quoted O'Hehir in concluding: "Well done Joe McDonagh".

Eponym
The Joe McDonagh Cup was created in 2017 as the new second tier senior inter-county championship in hurling after the All-Ireland Senior Hurling Championship. It was contested for the first time in 2018.

Fondúireacht Sheosaimh Mhic Dhonncha, a funding scheme to support Clubs with the promotions and the development of the Irish language was established by the GAA and Glór na nGael in his memory.

Honours

Player
University College Galway
Fitzgibbon Cup: 1977

Ballinderreen
Galway Junior B Hurling Championship: 1996 (c)

Galway
All-Ireland Senior Hurling Championship: 1980
National Hurling League: 1974-75
All-Ireland Under-21 Hurling Championship: 1972

Connacht
Railway Cup: 1982, 1983

Individual
Awards
All-Star (1): 1976

References

1953 births
2016 deaths
Alumni of the University of Galway
Ballinderreen hurlers
Connacht inter-provincial hurlers
Deaths from cancer in the Republic of Ireland
Dual players
Galway County Board administrators
Galway inter-county Gaelic footballers
Galway inter-county hurlers
University of Galway Gaelic footballers
University of Galway hurlers
People educated at Coláiste Éinde
Presidents of the Gaelic Athletic Association